Verity Credit Union is a not-for-profit credit union that was originally established in 1933 as Postal Works Credit Union #8 to serve members in select counties of Washington state. Verity has been member-owned since its inception. Verity's main branch is located in the Northgate neighborhood of Seattle, Washington.  Verity Credit Union has over $580 million in assets and more than 33,000 members. Verity Credit Union is noted for its social media endeavors and was the first financial institution to start a blog in 2004, which earned it a spot on Net.Banker's Innovator of the Year awards.

Branches
Verity Credit Union has eight branches throughout the Seattle metropolitan area.

Membership
Membership with Verity Credit Union is open to anyone who lives, works, worships or attends school in the state of Washington, as well as family members of an existing member or those who are employed within any of its affiliated organizations. Verity Credit Union also serves military employees, current and retired, and their extended families, located in 16 Washington counties.

Tonita Webb is the current CEO of Verity Credit Union.

References

External links 
 Official site
 Our Voices, official blog

Credit unions based in Washington (state)
1933 establishments in Washington (state)
Companies based in Seattle